Estriol dipropionate, or estriol 3,17β-dipropionate, is a synthetic estrogen and estrogen ester – specifically, the C3 and C17β dipropionate ester of estriol – which was first described in 1963 and was never marketed. Following a single intramuscular injection of 6.94 mg estriol dipropionate (equivalent to 5.0 mg estriol) in an oil solution, peak levels of estriol occurred after 0.83 days, an elimination half-life of 12.7 hours was observed, and estriol levels remained elevated for up to 4 days. For comparison, the duration of estriol was much shorter, while that of estriol dihexanoate was much longer.

See also
 List of estrogen esters § Estriol esters

References

Abandoned drugs
Estriol esters
Prodrugs
Propionate esters
Synthetic estrogens